Stan Grant may refer to:

Stan Grant (journalist) (born 1963), Australian journalist
Stan Grant (Wiradjuri elder) (born 1940), elder of the Wiradjuri tribe of Indigenous Australians

See also
Stanley Grant (1902–1993), British cinematographer and special effects expert